Chelsea is a historic home located in Delaware City, New Castle County, Delaware.  It was built in 1848 by Thomas Clark, and is a three-story, three-bay-square brick block with a low, almost flat, hipped roof surmounted by a widow's walk. It is in a regional variation of the Italianate / Greek Revival style.  It has a low, one-story wing at the east side, a wide, one-story glass-enclosed front porch and a large, two-story addition to the rear of the house.

It was listed on the National Register of Historic Places in 1982.

References

Houses on the National Register of Historic Places in Delaware
Greek Revival houses in Delaware
Italianate architecture in Delaware
Houses completed in 1848
Houses in New Castle County, Delaware
National Register of Historic Places in New Castle County, Delaware